Kootenay West is a provincial electoral district in British Columbia, Canada, established by the Electoral Districts Act, 2008.  It was first contested in the 2009 general election.

The riding is seen as a safe NDP seat; the party has won 12 out of the last 13 elections. Before the NDP victory in 1972, the riding voted consistently for Social Credit.

Geography
As of the 2020 provincial election, Kootenay West comprises the western portion of the Regional District of Central Kootenay and the southeastern portion of the Regional District of Kootenay Boundary. It is located in southern British Columbia and is bordered by Washington, United States to the south. Communities in the electoral district consist of Castlegar, Trail, Rossland, Fruitvale, and Nakusp.

Member of Legislative Assembly 
On account of the realignment of electoral boundaries, most incumbents did not represent the entirety of their listed district during the preceding legislative term.  Its MLA incumbent is Katrine Conroy, British Columbia New Democratic Party initially elected during the 2005 election to the West Kootenay-Boundary riding in British Columbia, Canada. Before 2001, the bulk of this riding was part of the Rossland-Trail riding.

Election results 

|-
 
|NDP
|Katrine Conroy
|align="right"|12,126
|align="right"|66.65%
|align="right"|
|align="right"|$56,860

|-

|- style="background:white;"
! style="text-align:right;" colspan="3"|Total Valid Votes
!align="right"|18,193
!align="right"|100%
|- style="background:white;"
! style="text-align:right;" colspan="3"|Total Rejected Ballots
!align="right"|88
!align="right"|0.48%
|- style="background:white;"
! style="text-align:right;" colspan="3"|Turnout
!align="right"|18,281
!align="right"|59.10%
|}

References

British Columbia provincial electoral districts
Castlegar, British Columbia